"You Can't Make Old Friends" is a song by Kenny Rogers in duet with Dolly Parton from Roger's 2013 album of the same name. It was written by Ryan Hanna King, Don Schlitz, Caitlyn Smith. The song was released as a digital download on September 3, 2013. Its music video premiered on ABC's Good Morning America on September 16. The song was subsequently sent to country radio on November 4. It debuted on the Billboard Country Airplay chart in December 2013, eventually peaking at number 57.

For their performance, Kenny Rogers and Dolly Parton were nominated in 2014 at the 56th Annual Grammy Awards for Grammy Award for Best Country Duo/Group Performance.

"You Can't Make Old Friends" was later included on Parton's 2014 album, Blue Smoke.

Personnel
 Dolly Parton – guest vocals
 J. T. Corenflos – electric guitar
 Eric Darken – percussion
 Paul Franklin – steel guitar
 Dann Huff – electric guitar
 Ilya Toshinsky – acoustic guitar
 Charlie Judge – acoustic piano
 Greg Morrow – drums
 Jimmie Lee Sloas – bass

Production
 Producer – Dann Huff
 Engineer – Todd Tidwell
 Additional Engineer – Russell Terrell
 Assistant Engineers – Shawn Daugherty, Mike Lancaster and Seth Morton.
 Recorded at Starstruck Studios (Nashville, TN).
 Additional Engineering at RTBGV (Nashville, TN).
 Kenny Rogers' vocals recorded by Steve Marcantonio at Starstruck Studios, Blackbird Studio (Nashville, TN) and Doppler Studios (Atlanta, GA). 
 Mixed by Steve Marcantonio at Blackbird Studio
 Digital Editing by Sean Neff

Charts

Cover versions
A cover version of "You Can't Make Old Friends", a duet between Nathan Carter and Lisa McHugh, appeared on McHugh's 2015 album Wildfire.

The Petersens released a Bluegrass version on May 20th 2020 on their Youtube Channel as a tribute to then recently deceased Kenny Rogers.

References

2013 songs
2013 singles
Kenny Rogers songs
Dolly Parton songs
Warner Records Nashville singles
Male–female vocal duets
Songs written by Don Schlitz
Song recordings produced by Dann Huff
Song recordings produced by Kyle Lehning
Music videos directed by Trey Fanjoy
Songs written by Caitlyn Smith